On May 15, 1697, a severe hailstorm tracked south-westwards between the towns of Hitchin (Hertfordshire) and Potton (Bedfordshire) in Southern England. The storm moved slowly, beginning at 9 am and finishing by 2 pm local time. This hailstorm is widely considered to be the worst hailstorm ever documented in the United Kingdom, with the largest hail ever measured in addition. Widespread damage to property was reported where the hailstorm had passed through, with slate roof tiles smashed to pieces and resulting in at least 1 death.

This particular hailstorm was assessed by TORRO as having reached "H8" intensity on their hailstorm destructivity scale. It is the only H8 hailstorm to have occurred in the UK, and is only joined by a few H7 rated storms in the country's recorded history. A H8 hailstorm is described by TORRO as being "destructive" and contains hail large enough to damage airplanes. Anything above a H9 rating is considered a "super hailstorm".

This hailstorm is analysed by TORRO to have attained a H7 rating, making it joint second place for the worst hailstorm in British history. 

The worst hailstorm in British history is the 1697 Hertfordshire hailstorm. The last hailstorm in the UK to receive a rating of H6+ or above was the 5 September 1958 storm, to date since, there has not been any storm rated above H6.

Measurements 
The hailstorm tracked for at least  over the towns of Hitchin, Potton and Offley. The largest hail is believed to have fallen over Offley, which sits to the southwest of Hitchin. The pieces of ice were described as being of irregular shape, with some oval shaped, some rounded and some flat. Local reports suggest that the hail was as large as a man's head. At Hitchin, a report was made of a hail diameter of an astonishing , if accurate, this would make it the largest hailstone ever to be documented as having fallen anywhere in the world, by far.

Damages 
The hailstorms slow movement meant that it caused severe damage, especially around Hitchin and Offley. During the storm's passage, at least one person was killed due to the hail, a young shepherd caught outside during the falling of the bowling ball sized hailstones. The hailstones came into contact with the Earth with such speed that they 'tore up the ground' and were powerful enough to split great Oak trees down the middle. Any tiles or windows on houses were easily smashed by the stones.

Widespread destruction was reported to crops, with every plantation 'felled before it [the hailstorm]', and people found precarious shelter in their homes. As well as one fatality, one person was found bruised all over, presumably unconscious. Pigeons, rooks and smaller birds were found brought down, as well as fatalities to livestock such as chickens.

References

Spring weather events
Weather events in England
Hailstorms